Prisoner of Japan is a 1942 American drama film directed by Arthur Ripley and written by Robert Chapin and Arthur Ripley. The film stars Alan Baxter, Gertrude Michael, Ernst Deutsch, Corinna Mura, Tom Seidel and Billy Moya. The film was released on July 22, 1942, by Producers Releasing Corporation.

Plot

Cast          
Alan Baxter as David Bowman
Gertrude Michael as Toni Chase
Ernst Deutsch as Matsuru 
Corinna Mura as Loti
Tom Seidel as Ens. Bailey
Billy Moya as Maui
Ray Bennett as Lt. Morgan
Dave O'Brien as U.S. Marine
Ann Staunton as Edie
Beal Wong as Japanese Radio Operator
Gil Frye as U.S. Radio Operator
Kent Thurber as Cmdr. McDonald

References

External links
 

1942 films
American drama films
1942 drama films
Producers Releasing Corporation films
Films directed by Arthur Ripley
American black-and-white films
1940s English-language films
1940s American films